Sirpur Town railway station is a major station on New Delhi–Chennai main line in Secunderabad division of South Central Railway in Indian Railways. It serves the Sirpur (T) town in Komaram Bheem district in Telangana. The elevation of the railway station is 192 m above sea level. It is the last railway station in Telangana before crossing over to Maharashtra.

References

Coordinates on Wikidata
Railway stations in Komaram Bheem district